William McKinley Brooks III (born July 22, 1953) is a former American football wide receiver in the National Football League (NFL). He was drafted by the Cincinnati Bengals 11th overall in the 1976 NFL Draft. He played college football at Oklahoma.  Brooks also played for the San Diego Chargers and Houston Oilers.

Personal life
Brooks has twin sons, both actors Mehcad Brooks, Billy Brooks Jr., with Austin American-Statesman editorial writer Alberta Phillips.

References

1953 births
Living people
American football wide receivers
Cincinnati Bengals players
Houston Oilers players
Navarro Bulldogs football players
Oklahoma Sooners football players
San Diego Chargers players
Players of American football from Austin, Texas